Seyi Adeleke (born 17 November 1991) is a Nigerian professional footballer who plays as a left-back or midfielder.

He signed his first professional contract for Lazio and was loaned to Pergocrema, Salernitana and FC Biel-Bienne, before moving to Western Sydney Wanderers in 2015. He subsequently returned to Italy to play for Arcella.

Early life
Born in Lagos, Nigeria, Adeleke moved to Italy in 2007 as a teenager.

Career
On 22 August 2015, Adeleke joined Australian club Western Sydney Wanderers. On 7 November 2015, he made his Wanderers debut. He travelled with the club to the 2015 FIFA Club World Cup, and missed his kick in the penalty shoot-out loss to ES Sétif which saw the Wanders finish sixth. On 13 February 2016, it was announced that Adeleke had left Western Sydney Wanderers.

In May 2016 Adeleke signed with Arcella, based in Padua, Italy, playing in Prima Categoria. In 2016, however, Adeleke's Italian residency status came under threat. Needing to be a "professional athlete", as the league in which he was playing (Promozione) was an amateur league, Adeleke's permit was not renewed by the Italian National Olympic Committee. Adeleke appealed this on the grounds that he was receiving payment to play.

See also
 List of foreign A-League players
 List of Western Sydney Wanderers FC players

References

External links
 

1991 births
Living people
Nigerian footballers
Nigerian expatriate footballers
S.S. Lazio players
U.S. Pergolettese 1932 players
U.S. Salernitana 1919 players
FC Biel-Bienne players
Alsancak Yeşilova footballers
Western Sydney Wanderers FC players
Sportspeople from Lagos
Yoruba sportspeople
Association football midfielders